The La Côte Airfield (ICAO code LSGP) is a private airfield in Prangins, Switzerland. It hosted a fly-in in 2009, 2011, 2013, on August 15, 2015 and in 2019.

References

External links 
 Webcam directed at the runway
 Approach Cards

Airports in Switzerland